Tropheus annectens is a species of cichlid endemic to Lake Tanganyika, where it is found on a substrate consisting of large, fixed rock. It can be found in the aquarium trade.

References

annectens
Taxa named by George Albert Boulenger
Fish of Lake Tanganyika
Fish described in 1900
Taxonomy articles created by Polbot